Inskip-with-Sowerby is a civil parish in the Borough of Wyre, in Lancashire, England. A part of the Fylde, the parish includes the village of Inskip and the hamlets Crossmoor to the west and Sowerby to the east. In 2011 it had a population of 840.

The parish adjoins the Wyre parishes of Great Eccleston, Upper Rawcliffe-with-Tarnacre and Myerscough and Bilsborrow, along with Woodplumpton in the City of Preston and also Treales, Roseacre and Wharles and Elswick in the Borough of Fylde.

Toponymy
The first part of the name Inskip may be the Brittonic ïnïs meaning "island" (Welsh ), in place names generally referring to dry land in a marshy flood-prone area. Suffixed may be the Brittonic *cib meaning any rounded receptacle, presumably with some topographic sense, Old English  or Anglo-Latin cuppa, with the sense "fish-trap" recorded for both.

History
Inskip was listed in the Domesday Book of 1086 as Inscip along with Sowerby Sorbi, within the Amounderness Hundred. Inskip's area was estimated in that survey to be two carucates of land, with Sowerby half the size.  Both manors belonging to Tostig Godwinson prior to the Norman Conquest.

Inskip's church is dedicated to St Peter. It was built in 1848 and was financed by the Earl of Derby and William Hornby, then the vicar of St Michael's Church, St Michael's on Wyre and later inaugural Archdeacon of Lancaster.

A military radio communications facility has been developed on the former RNAS Inskip airfield in the Higham area to the south-east of the parish (extending into Treales, Roseacre and Wharles parish). It was known as 'HMS Nightjar' during World War I and World War II.

An ancient area of common land at Carr House Green in the south of the parish is today owned by the parish council. 10 local properties still have legal rights to graze cattle and geese on the open grassland, but it is now used as a recreation site.

Governance
Inskip-with-Sowerby was once a township in the ancient parish of St Michael's on Wyre. This became a civil parish in 1866, forming part of the Garstang Rural District from 1894 till 1974. It has since become part of the Borough of Wyre.

Along with Great Eccleston, Upper Rawcliffe-with-Tarnacre, Kirkland and Out Rawcliffe, Inskip-with-Sowerby forms part of the Great Eccleston ward of Wyre Borough Council.

Media gallery

See also

Listed buildings in Inskip-with-Sowerby

References

Footnotes

Sources

External links

Parish council website

Civil parishes in Lancashire
Geography of the Borough of Wyre
The Fylde